Jinadattasuri was a Jain Apabhramsa poet.

He was born in 1075 and died in 1154. He was a contemporary of Hemchandra and a disciple of Jinavallabhsuri.

Works
His Upadesharasayana-rasa (1143) is a didactic poem of 80 verse written in the form of a Rasa. In appreciation of his teacher Jinavallabhsuri, he wrote a didactic poem in 32 verses titled Kalaswarupakulakam in Apabhramsa and Chachchari.

References

1075 births
1154 deaths
Indian male poets
Indian Jain monks
11th-century Indian Jains
11th-century Jain monks
11th-century Indian monks
11th-century Indian poets
12th-century Indian Jain writers
12th-century Jain monks
12th-century Indian monks
12th-century Indian poets
Śvētāmbara monks